José Andrés Salazar Mijangos (born 11 January 1997) is a sprinter from El Salvador who competed at the 2020 Summer Olympics.

Early and personal life
Salazar played association football in the third division of the El Salvadorian leagues before switching his full attention to competing at athletics in 2017. His father had also been a footballer in El Salvador.

Career
Salazar competed in the men's 200m race at the 2020 Summer Olympics; he ran 21.66 seconds to finish seventh in his heat. Salazar was almost unable to compete after suffering a muscle injury to his right thigh competing in the 100 metres at the 2021 Central American Championships in Athletics, in Costa Rica, on June 26 2021.

References

1997 births
Living people
Salvadoran footballers
Salvadoran male sprinters
Olympic athletes of El Salvador
Athletes (track and field) at the 2020 Summer Olympics
Association footballers not categorized by position